Snowdon Peak is a  mountain summit located in San Juan County, Colorado, United States. It is situated seven miles south of the community of Silverton, in the Weminuche Wilderness, on land managed by San Juan National Forest. It is part of the San Juan Mountains range which is a subset of the Rocky Mountains of North America, and is set nine miles west of the Continental Divide. Neighbors include Mount Garfield three miles to the east-southeast, and Twilight Peak, which is the nearest higher peak, 3.7 miles to the south-southwest. This mountain can be seen from U.S. Route 550. The mountain is named after Snowdon, the highest mountain in Wales.

Climate 
According to the Köppen climate classification system, Snowdon Peak is located in an alpine subarctic climate zone with long, cold, snowy winters, and cool to warm summers. Due to its altitude, it receives precipitation all year, as snow in winter, and as thunderstorms in summer, with a dry period in late spring. Precipitation runoff from the mountain drains into tributaries of the Animas River.

Geology 
The formation dates to the Statherian period and is interpreted as metamorphosed marine and fluvial sandstone, mudstone, and shale. The formation overlies plutons with an age of 1,707 million years.

Gallery

See also

References

External links 

 Weather forecast: Snowdon Peak

Mountains of San Juan County, Colorado
San Juan Mountains (Colorado)
Mountains of Colorado
North American 3000 m summits
San Juan National Forest